Graeme Edward Lowans (8 May 1934 – 19 February 2014) was a New Zealand cricketer who played first-class cricket for Central Districts from 1959 to 1965, and Hawke Cup cricket for Nelson from 1958 to 1975.

His best first-class season was his first, 1959–60, when he made 395 runs at 35.90. He scored his only century the next season when he made 100 against Canterbury.  

He was a stalwart for Nelson in the Hawke Cup, forming an opening partnership with his Central Districts partner Lawrie Reade during Nelson's hold on the title between 1958 and 1965. He played in 39 Hawke Cup challenge and elimination matches, scoring 2120 runs at 37.19 and hitting four centuries.

Born in Nelson, Lowans was educated at Nelson College from 1947 to 1949. He and his wife Marilynne had three daughters.

References

External links
 

1934 births
2014 deaths
New Zealand cricketers
Central Districts cricketers
Cricketers from Nelson, New Zealand
People educated at Nelson College